Hajj Arash (also Romanized as Ḩājj Arash; also known as Hājī Arash, Ḩājjī Ārash, Ḩājjī Arash, Ḩājjī Arsh, Hājrāsh, and Khadzhrash) is a village in Zanjanrud-e Bala Rural District, in the Central District of Zanjan County, Zanjan Province, Iran. At the 2006 census, its population was 535, in 149 families.

References 

Populated places in Zanjan County